Barsukov (masculine) or Barsukova (feminine) is a Russian surname. Notable people with the surname include:

Anna Barsukova (filmmaker) (born 1981), Russian film director, screenwriter, camerawoman and musician
Anna Barsukova (model) (born 1988), Russian entrepreneur and former fashion model
Mikhail Barsukov (born 1947), Russian politician
Sergei Barsukov (born 1985), Russian footballer
Valeri Barsukov (1928–1992), Russian Soviet scientist
Yulia Barsukova (born 1978), Russian rhythmic gymnast

See also
Barsukov Seamount, seamount of Antarctica

Russian-language surnames